Liu Guozhong (born July 1962) is a Chinese politician and a member of the Politburo of the Chinese Communist Party who has served as a vice premier of the People's Republic of China since March 2023.

He began his career in Heilongjiang province before serving stints at the All-China Federation of Trade Unions and as deputy party secretary of Sichuan. He had served as Governor of Jilin and Shannxi from 2016 to 2020. He served as the Party Secretary of Shaanxi from 2020 to 2022.

Early life
Liu was born in Wangkui County, Heilongjiang province. He joined the Chinese Communist Party in November 1986. He attended the Nanjing Institute of Technology where he majored in artillery system fuse design and manufacturing, and has a graduate degree from the Harbin Institute of Technology.

Political career 
Liu began his political career in the General Office of the provincial government of Heilongjiang. He served as deputy director of Research and party secretary of Hegang. He was appointed a member of the Heilongjiang provincial party standing committee, then the secretary-general of the party committee in May the same year, and in September 2011, named executive vice governor of Heilongjiang.

In October 2013, Liu was named a member of the Secretariat of the All-China Federation of Trade Unions.

In February 2016, he was transferred to become deputy party secretary of Sichuan. He served for ten months, before being transferred to Jilin to become acting governor, confirmed by the provincial People's Congress on January 19, 2017.

In December 2017, he was appointed as deputy party secretary of Shaanxi. Later he was appointed as the Governor. In July 2020, he was appointed to be the party secretary of Shaanxi succeeding Hu Heping. He was succeeded as Communist Party secretary of Shaanxi on 27 November 2022, being succeeded by Zhao Yide.

After the 20th Party National Congress, he was elected as a member of the CCP Politburo. On 12 March 2023, he was appointed as a vice premier of the People's Republic of China.

References 

1962 births
People from Suihua
Living people
Governors of Shaanxi
Governors of Jilin
People's Republic of China politicians from Heilongjiang
Nanjing Institute of Technology alumni
Harbin Institute of Technology alumni
Members of the 19th Central Committee of the Chinese Communist Party
Members of the 20th Politburo of the Chinese Communist Party
Deputy Communist Party secretaries of Shaanxi
Vice Premiers of the People's Republic of China